Haijian 75 is a China Marine Surveillance (CMS) ship in the 7th Marine Surveillance Flotilla of CMS's South China Sea Fleet. She is one of the fastest CMS ships in the second building plan. She was commissioned on October 26, 2010.

Deployments 
On October 25, 2012, Haijian 75 conducted cruise operations in waters around the disputed Diaoyu Islands. Through radio, personnel on Haijian 75 ordered nearby JCG ships to leave and collected evidence of JCG ships' presence.

CMS ships of the same class, 1,000t-class Type-II, include Haijian 66.

CMS-75 was renamed CCG-3175 in July 2013.

References

Ships of the China Marine Surveillance